E50 or E-50 may refer to:
 Nimzo-Indian Defence, Encyclopaedia of Chess Openings code
 E-50 Standardpanzer, a German World War II tank model in the Entwicklung series
 European route E50, a road connecting Brest in France with Makhachkala in the Russian Republic of Dagestan
 M113 E50, a version of the Mercedes-Benz M113 engine
 M2 E-50, a version of the M2 Browning machine gun
 Nokia E50, a smartphone
 HMS E50, a British E class submarine of the First World War
 E50, a road route in Japan:
 Kita-Kantō Expressway
 Higashi-Mito Road
 Hitachinaka Road